End of the Road Festival is an annual music festival in England which focuses on independent rock and folk music. It is hosted at the Larmer Tree Gardens, on the border of north Dorset and Wiltshire, and usually takes place over the last weekend of August or the first full weekend in September. The first festival took place in 2006, and after selling out for the first time in 2008, it has sold out in advance every year since.

Description 
The festival was started by two friends, Simon Taffe and Sofia Hagberg, who continue to run it.

The festival has four stages: the Woods Stage, the Garden Stage, the Big Top Stage and the Tipi Tent, as well as a clearing in the woods around the Garden Stage containing a piano at which semi-secret sets take place. There are also children's areas and workshops, a healing field, a film tent, comedy, a library in the forest and a games area (ping pong, table football etc.). Late night entertainment usually includes high-profile DJ sets, a silent disco, unpublicised pop-up performances and karaoke. Due to the nature of the gardens the festival is set in, it is not unusual to see peacocks wandering around the area and macaws in the trees.

The festival has a capacity of 15,000 (2014). The site opens for camping on Thursday afternoon and the entertainment runs from Thursday evening to Sunday inclusive. 

In 2011, the festival won an award for 'Best Small Festival' at the UK Festival Awards. In 2012 claims were made that the festival was secretly organised by Scientology. A statement made by the festival denied these claims, while acknowledging that two members of management were Scientologists. In 2016, 2017 and 2019, the festival won an award for 'Best Small Festival' at the NME Awards.

The 2020 festival was cancelled as a result of the COVID-19 pandemic. The festival returned in 2021 with some of the same artists including King Krule, Little Simz, The Comet Is Coming, Squid, Dry Cleaning and Richard Dawson.

End of the Road returns 1–4 September 2022 with line up including Pixies, Fleet Foxes, Bright Eyes, Khruangbin, The Magnetic Fields, Aldous Harding, Kurt Vile & the Violators, Perfume Genius, Kevin Morby, Tinariwen, black midi, Lucy Dacus, Greentea Peng, and many more.

Line-ups

2006 festival
The first festival took place on 15–17 September. It was headlined on the Friday by Josh Ritter, on Saturday by Badly Drawn Boy and on Sunday by Ryan Adams. Other artists included Absentee, The Boy Least Likely To, Brakes, British Sea Power, Chris T-T, Darren Hayman, Dawn Landes, Ed Harcourt, El Perro Del Mar, Electric Soft Parade, Emmy the Great, Fanfarlo, Frightened Rabbit, Gravenhurst, Guillemots, Holly Golightly, Howe Gelb, I'm from Barcelona, James Yorkston, Jeremy Warmsley, Jim Noir, Jolie Holland, Kathryn Williams, Metronomy, Micah P Hinson, Richard Hawley, Simple Kid, Suburban Kids with Biblical Names, Tilly and the Wall

2007 festival
The second event, held 14–16 September, was given a full-marks five-star review by The Independent newspaper. It was headlined by Yo La Tengo, Super Furry Animals and Lambchop, and also featured Archie Bronson Outfit, Architecture in Helsinki, The Bees, Brakes, British Sea Power, The Broken Family Band, The Concretes, Danielson, Darren Hayman, Dawn Landes, Euros Childs, Frida Hyvönen, Herman Dune, Howe Gelb (who also curated the two main stages on the Friday, headlining the Big Top stage with a Giant Sand jam session), I'm from Barcelona, James Yorkston, Jeffrey Lewis, Jens Lekman, Joan As Police Woman, John Parish, Johnny Flynn, Josh T Pearson, King Creosote, Loney Dear, Malcolm Middleton, Midlake, Pete and the Pirates, Robyn Hitchcock (who was accompanied by John Paul Jones), Scout Niblett, Seasick Steve, Stephanie Dosen, The Twilight Sad, Willard Grant Conspiracy and Zombie-Zombie.

2008 festival
For the first sellout year, over 12–14 September, the headliners were Conor Oberst & The Mystic Valley Band, Mercury Rev and Calexico. Also appearing were A Hawk And A Hacksaw, Akron/Family, American Music Club, Billy Childish and the Musicians of the British Empire, Bon Iver, Brakes, British Sea Power, Darren Hayman playing Hefner songs, Dirty Three, Jason Molina, Jeffrey Lewis, Kimya Dawson, Kurt Wagner, Laura Marling, Low, Micah P Hinson, The Mountain Goats, Noah & the Whale, Richard Hawley, Robyn Hitchcock, Someone Still Loves You Boris Yeltsin, Sons of Noel and Adrian, Sun Kil Moon, Tindersticks, Two Gallants, The Wave Pictures and Zombie-Zombie.

2009 festival
The 2009 festival took place on 11–13 September. Explosions in the Sky, Fleet Foxes and The Hold Steady were headliners. Also playing were The Acorn, Alela Diane, Beth Jeans Houghton, Blitzen Trapper, The Boy Least Likely To, The Broken Family Band, Charlie Parr, Darren Hayman, David Thomas Broughton, Dent May & His Magnificent Ukulele, Dirty Projectors, The Dodos, Efterklang, Herman Dune, The Horrors, Josh T Pearson, The Leisure Society, The Low Anthem, Malcolm Middleton, Mumford & Sons, Neko Case, Okkervil River, Richmond Fontaine, Shearwater, Steve Earle, Vetiver and Wildbirds & Peacedrums.

2010 festival

For its fifth year, the festival took place from 10 to 12 September. Headliners were Modest Mouse, Yo La Tengo and Wilco. Also playing were Deer Tick, Wolf Parade, The Low Anthem, The Felice Brothers, Woodpigeon, Phosphorescent, The Wilderness of Manitoba, The Unthanks, Iron & Wine, The Mountains and the Trees, Annie & The Beekeepers, Dylan LeBlanc, Joe Pug, CW Stoneking, Charlie Parr, Frank Fairfield, Daniel Lefkowitz, Monotonix, The Mountain Goats, The New Pornographers, Caribou, The Antlers, Citay, Freelance Whales, a Jarvis Cocker DJ Set and many, many more. Also present was comedian Russel Howard and music journalist Barney Hoskyns.

2011 festival
In 2011 the festival took place from 2 to 4 September. Headliners were Beirut, Joanna Newsom and Mogwai. Also playing were Midlake, Laura Marling, The Walkmen, Wild Beasts, The Fall, Lykke Li, Tinariwen, The Unthanks, M. Ward, Gruff Rhys, Okkervil River, Phosphorescent, John Grant, Clap Your Hands Say Yeah, Best Coast, White Denim, Tune-Yards, Willy Mason, The Black Angels, Wooden Shjips, Jolie Holland, Josh T Pearson, Kurt Vile, Micah P Hinson, James Yorkston, Gordon Gano & the Ryans, Caitlin Rose, The Leisure Society, Brakes, Zola Jesus, Austra, Beth Jeans Houghton, Timber Timbre, Allo Darlin, Bob Log III, The Unthanks, Woods, Midlake, Lanterns on the Lake, Sam Amidon and more. There was also comedy from Robin Ince, Jo Neary, and Simon Munnery and literature from Laura Barton, Rob Young, Clinton Heylin and others.

The festival won the award for "Best Small Festival" at the 2011 UK Festival Awards.

2012 festival
In 2012 the festival took place from 31 August to 2 September. Headliners were Patti Smith, Grandaddy, Beach House, Grizzly Bear, Alabama Shakes. Also playing were Dirty Three, Midlake, The Low Anthem, Roy Harper, Mark Lanegan, Tindersticks, Jeffrey Lewis, Robyn Hitchcock, Graham Coxon, Villagers, Patrick Watson, Justin Townes Earle, First Aid Kit, Deer Tick, Anna Calvi, I Break Horses, Moulettes, Gravenhurst, The Futureheads, Mountain Man, Alt-J, Islet, Sleep Party People, Frank Fairfield, Woods, Patti Smith, Tindersticks, Lanterns on the Lake, Jonathan Wilson, Leif Vollebekk, Van Dyke Parks, Deer Tick, Francois & the Atlas Mountains, Dirty Beaches and more.

2013 festival
The 2013 festival took place from 30 August to 1 September. The line-up included Sigur Rós, Belle and Sebastian, David Byrne & St Vincent, Dinosaur Jr., Efterklang, Warpaint, Jens Lekman, Eels, Ralfe Band, Allo Darlin', Mark Mulcahy, Doug Paisley, Matthew E. White, Serafina Steer, Parquet Courts, Wolf Alice, Pokey Lafarge, Ethan Johns, Cass McCombs, Frontier Ruckus, Ed Harcourt, East India Youth, Dutch Uncles, RM Hubbert, Golden Fable, Trembling Bells & Mike Heron, Daughn Gibson, Frightened Rabbit, The Barr Brothers, The Walkmen, Charlie Boyer & the Voyeurs, Bo Ningen, Palma Violets, Public Service Broadcasting, Strand of Oaks, Marika Hackman, Landshapes, Evans the Death, Tigercats, Julianna Barwick, Caitlin Rose, William Tyler, Damien Jurado, Daughter, Deap Vally, Catfish and the Bottlemen, Diana Jones, Braids, King Khan and Doug Paisley.

2014 festival
The festival took place 28–30 August. The 2014 headliners were "The Gene Clark No Other Band"*, The Flaming Lips and Wild Beasts. Other notable acts included St. Vincent, The Horrors, Yo La Tengo, John Grant, Stephen Malkmus and the Jicks, White Denim, British Sea Power, Gruff Rhys, Tune-Yards, Unknown Mortal Orchestra, Ezra Furman, Adult Jazz, The Wave Pictures, Cate Le Bon, Sweet Baboo, H. Hawkline, Lucius, Perfume Genius, Lau, Archie Bronson Outfit, The Felice Brothers, Marissa Nadler, Benjamin Booker, The Radiophonic Workshop, British Sea Power, Jenny Lewis, Stealing Sheep, Kiran Leonard, Tiny Ruins, Benjamin Clementine, Johnny Flynn & The Sussex Wit, Sam Lee, Temples, Laish, Pink Mountaintops, Ghost of a Sabre Toothed Tiger, Woods, and Tinariwen.

The Gene Clark No Other Band was a supergroup formed especially to perform Gene Clark's 1974 solo album No Other in full. Having toured the east coast of the US, End of the Road was their sole UK performance.

2015 festival
In 2015 the festival celebrated its 10th anniversary and it took place on 4–6 September. The line up included Tame Impala, Sufjan Stevens in his only 2015 European festival date and The War on Drugs, Mac Demarco, Future Islands, My Morning Jacket, Laura Marling, Django Django, Alvvays, Fat White Family, Slow Club, The Duke Spirit, The King Khan & BBQ Show, Torres, Oscar, Hinds, Low, Fuzz, Natalie Prass, Ought, Stealing Sheep, Giant Sand, Marika Hackman, Kevin Morby, East India Youth, Sleaford Mods, Girlpool, Du Blonde, Brakes, Wand, Jacco Gardner, Flo Morrissey, Metz, Pond, Kiran Leonard, Peter Matthew Bauer, H Hawkline, Ryley Walker, Fumaca Preta, Ultimate Painting, Jane Weaver, Andy Shauf, Saint Etienne, Giant Sand, Palma Violets, Meilyr Jones, Euros Childs, Ex Hex, Diagrams, Stephen Steinbrink and Crushed Beaks.

2016 festival
Following on from winning the 'Best Small Festival award at the 2016 NME Awards, the 2016 festival took place on 1–4 September, expanding to the Thursday night for the first time. The line up included The Shins, Joanna Newsom, Animal Collective, Bat For Lashes, Cat Power, Teenage Fanclub, Devendra Banhart, Local Natives, Goat, Savages, Thee Oh Sees, Broken Social Scene, Phosphorescent, Thurston Moore, Sam Beam & Jesca Hoop, M. Ward, Scritti Politti, Jeffrey Lewis & Los Bolts, Steve Mason, JD McPherson, Shura, Field Music, Omar Souleyman, King Gizzard & the Lizard Wizard, Bill Ryder-Jones, Kevin Morby, Eleanor Friedberger, Dr. Dog, Kelley Stoltz, U.S Girls, Money, Anna Meredith, Jenny Hval, Ezra Furman, Field Music, Sunflower Bean, Karl Blau, Tigercats, Lail Arad and J.F. Robitaille, Meilyr Jones, Hard Skin, Kevin Morby, B.C. Camplight, BEAK>, The Leaf Library, Flamingods and many more.

2017 festival
After again winning the 'Best Small Festival' award at the 2017 NME Awards, the 2017 festival took place from 31 August to 3 September. The line-up included Father John Misty performing his first UK headline festival set, along with the year's only UK festival shows from Mac DeMarco, Bill Callahan, Lucinda Williams, Amadou & Mariam, Ty Segall, Perfume Genius, Parquet Courts, Alvvays, Foxygen, Car Seat Headrest, Jens Lekman, Baxter Dury, Deerhoof and Waxahatchee. Acts returning to the festival from previous years included Japandroids, Pond, Nadine Shah, Bill Ryder-Jones, Jens Lekman, Ryley Walker, Ultimate Painting, Parquet Courts, DUDS, Gulp and Marika Hackman. Other notable acts, including The Jesus & Mary Chain, Slowdive, Real Estate, The Lemon Twigs, The Moonlandingz, Rolling Blackouts Coastal Fever, Moses Sumney, Deerhoof, Laraaji, Kelly Lee Owens, Brix & the Extricated, Waxahatchee, Xylouris White and Starcrawler performed at the festival for the first time.

2018 festival
The 2018 festival took place from 30 August to 2 September. The line-up was as follows:

Woods Stage

Garden Stage

Big Top

The Tipi

2019 festival 
The 2019 festival took place from 29 August to 1 September. The line-up was as follows:

Woods Stage

Garden Stage

Big Top

The Tipi

Talking Heads Stage

2020 festival
The 2020 festival was cancelled as a result of the COVID-19 pandemic. It was due to be headlined by Pixies, Angel Olsen, King Krule and Big Thief, with other notable slots taken by Bright Eyes, Richard Hawley and Little Simz. Some of the acts featured on the proposed line-up would go on to play the 2021 edition of the festival, though this was hampered by notable COVID-19 travel restrictions.

2021 festival
The 2021 festival took place from 2 September to 5 September. The line-up was as follows:

Woods Stage

Garden Stage

Big Top

The Tipi

Talking Heads Stage

2022 festival 
End of the Road returned to Larmer Tree Gardens in 2022, from 1 to 4 September. The line-up included Khruangbin, Pixies, Fleet Foxes, Bright Eyes, The Magnetic Fields, Aldous Harding, Kurt Vile & the Violators, Perfume Genius, Kevin Morby, Tinariwen, black midi, Lucy Dacus, Greentea Peng and LUNGE.

Wu-Lu, Umlauts and Circuit des Yeux also performed. The latter was described in the Guardian's review as having "a baritone that could beach a pod of whales and a falsetto that could calve icebergs".

References

External links
 
 

Music festivals in Wiltshire